"Me Gustas Tu" (: "From today, we") is a song recorded by South Korean girl group GFriend for their second extended play, Flower Bud (2015). The song was released by Source Music on July 23, 2015, as the EP's title track. Often dubbed as 2015 South Korea's National Anthem due to its impact to Hallyu Wave and breaking the barriers against the tension among North Koreans through music, the song was considered as GFriend's breakout hit as it became their first-ever Japanese song and later installed as the lead single of their compilation album Kyō Kara Watashitachi wa ~ GFriend 1st Best ~. 

GFriend promoted the album with a series of televised live performances on South Korea's music shows. "Me Gustas Tu" was noted for its powerful choreography, unusual for a girl group with an "innocent" image. A fan-taken video of the group performing the song on a slippery stage went viral in September 2015, boosting the group's popularity. The song peaked at number 8 on the Gaon Digital Chart with 100 million streams and has sold over two million digital copies in South Korea.

Composition 
The song was written and produced by Iggy and Youngbae, who previously produced the debut song of the group.

Release and promotion

On July 13, 2015, Source Music announced the upcoming release of GFriend's second EP, Flower Bud. The album was released as a digital download on July 23, and was released in CD format on July 27. The music video for lead single "Me Gustas Tu" was produced by Zanybros and directed by Hong Won-ki. One of the settings is a "dream-like" forest with the members wearing white lace dresses and rompers. "Me Gustas Tu" is the second song in the group's "school series" and represents a trip during summer vacation. The group's "pure" image was complemented by powerful dance choreography, rare for a girl group with an "innocent" concept. The choreography was created by Park Jun-hee, and the most notable part involves Yerin vaulting over Umji, while Yuju slides underneath in a split. It took the group three months to perfect the difficult moves.

GFriend promoted the album with performances of "Me Gustas Tu" on various music shows, starting with M Countdown on July 23. On September 5, they performed the song at an SBS Radio event in Inje, Gangwon Province. The stage floor was wet due to the rain, and Yuju slipped and fell five times during the performance, while SinB fell once. A fan posted a video of the performance to YouTube, which subsequently went viral, boosting the group's popularity. Promotion for the album ended the next day, with a performance of "Glass Bead" and "Me Gustas Tu" on Inkigayo.

In January 2016, "Me Gustas Tu" was one of the songs broadcast via loudspeaker across the Korean Demilitarized Zone, as part of South Korea's anti-Pyongyang propaganda program Voice of Freedom. The broadcast was a response to a North Korean nuclear bomb test.

Japanese version 
In February 2018, GFriend signed with King Records. In late May, the group boarded for Japan to promote the compilation album Kyō Kara Watashitachi wa ~ GFriend 1st Best ~ which was released on May 23. The album consists of twelve songs including both Korean and Japanese-language versions of "Me Gustas Tu".

The full music video of the Japanese version of "Me Gustas Tu" was released on May 6.

Chart performance 
The song debuted at number 27 on the Gaon Digital Chart, on the chart issue dated July 19–25, 2015, with 66,912 downloads sold and 1,014,574 streams. In its second week, the song rose to number 15. In its eighth week, the song peaked at number 8, staying for two consecutive weeks, marking the group's first Top 10 single in South Korea.

The song placed at number 59 on the chart, for the month of July 2015, with 137,376 downloads sold and 3,061,299 streams. For the month of August, the song rose to number 23, with 230,905 downloads sold and 9,734,931 streams, and peaked at number 13 in September, with 233,310 downloads sold and 13,117,951 streams.

The song made the year-end chart as the 38th best selling song of 2015, selling 1,013,776 downloads and accumulating 50,169,974 streams. It was also the 27th best selling song of 2016, selling 1,150,274 downloads and accumulating 66,037,226 streams.

The song surpassed 100 million streams in July 2016 and 2,500,000 downloads in November 2017.

Music video 
A music video for the song was released first on MBC Music on July 20, 2015 (rated as "suitable for all ages") and uploaded three days later on the respective YouTube channels of the group and the single's distributor. The video, directed by Hong Won-ki from Zanybros, features the group in outdoor scenes, intercalated with dance scenes in a field.

Due to the distribution change from Genie Music (formerly KT Music) to kakao M (formerly LOEN Entertainment), the music video was reuploaded on the YouTube channel of the latter's 1theK service on November 2, 2017. In turn, Genie Music deleted the video from its own account.

Accolades

2016 Year-End/Decade Listicles

Year-End Awards/Other Accolades

Charts

Weekly charts

Year-end charts

Sales

Download Sales

Streaming Chart

Notes

References 

2015 singles
2015 songs
GFriend songs
Korean-language songs
Hybe Corporation singles